Machiavellianism in the workplace is a concept studied by many organizational psychologists. Conceptualized originally by Richard Christie and Florence Geis, Machiavellianism refers to a psychological trait concept where individuals behave in a cold and duplicitous manner. It has in recent times been adapted and applied to the context of the workplace and organizations by many writers and academics. 

Oliver James wrote on the effects of Machiavellianism and other dark triad personality traits in the workplace, the others being narcissism and psychopathy.

A new model of Machiavellianism based in organizational settings consists of three factors:
 maintaining power
 harsh management tactics
 manipulative behaviors.
Examples of behaviors that individuals high in Machiavellianism may do include:

 Theft (tangible or intangible)
 Lying/Deceit
 Sabotage
 Cheating (passive or active)

High Machs can exhibit high levels of charisma, and their leadership can be beneficial in some areas.

The presence of Machiavellianism in an organization has been positively correlated with counterproductive workplace behaviour and workplace deviance.

The origin of Machiavellianism entering the workplace can be tied to multiple factors, such as distrust towards others, pessimism, survival/self-protection tactics, or even the gender of involved parties.

Impact on Employee Satisfaction and Well-being 
Being under machiavellian leadership can negatively impact the performance or productivity inside an organization. A study shows a link between job satisfaction and level of Machiavellianism, in which the higher the level of machiavellian orientation by upper management and leaders, the higher the chance of employees experiencing lower job satisfaction.

In the same study, it was found that managers with high Machiavellian behaviors also reported higher job strain, less job satisfaction, and fewer perceived opportunities for formal control in the work environment.

Research has shown that high levels of Machiavellianism, both exuding the traits and witnessing the traits in the workplace, correlate with higher levels of job strain, lower levels of job satisfaction, and lower levels of overall career satisfaction.

Perceived actions of Machiavellianism can cause significant stress and lead to distrust among employees and leaders. This can be due to the manipulative behaviors, low empathy, and self-focused motives that individuals high in Machiavellianism may exude in their workplaces. As a result of being potential victims of these behaviors, employees may experience a lack of trust, higher levels of stress, and a lower sense of commitment to the workplace.

Bullying in the workplace is another problem that can arise from machiavellian tendencies and that can contribute to stress levels among workers. A study shows a correlation between workplace bullying experiences and Machiavellian tendencies, which usually results in lower job satisfaction among those workers being a victim of workplace bullying.

Leadership 
Machiavellian leadership is known to be one of the unethical and destructive types of leadership.

Machiavellianism behaviors may appear in the workplace due to signals being sent from leaders to their employees. In a study done in 2016, it was found that there was a particular relationship between low-ethical leadership behaviors and higher levels of manipulative behaviors from their followers. However, the followers do not have to have pre-existing high levels of Machiavellianism in the workplace. This suggests that these negative behaviors could be unintentional and are a result of employees trying to fulfill their workplace responsibilities. 

High levels of Machiavellian behavior among leaders have been positively associated with higher ratings of abusive supervision among regular workers, contributing to low job satisfaction, which results in a negative impact on the workers' well-being. 

Employees that are high in Machiavellianism may participate in knowledge hiding, a technique of withholding or hiding knowledge from co-workers.  This could then lead to damage in co-worker relations and distrust in the workplace.Employees high in Machiavellianism may not only target their co-workers but also their supervisors. In a study done, it was found that employees high in Machiavellianism may engage in emotionally manipulative behaviors toward their supervisors, especially those low on ethical leadership.

Job interviews

Individuals who are high in Machiavellianism may be more willing and more skilled at lying and less likely to give honest answers during interviews. Individuals high in Machiavellianism have stronger intentions to use deception in interviews compared to psychopaths or narcissists and are also more likely to see the use of lying in interviews as fair. Men and women high in Machiavellianism may use different tactics to influence interviewers. In one study, which examined how much applicants allowed the interviewers to direct the topics covered during the interview, women high in  Machiavellianism tended to allow interviewers more freedom to direct the content of the interview. Men high in Machiavellianism gave interviewers the least amount of freedom in directing the content of the interview. Men high in Machiavellianism were also more likely to make up information about themselves or their experiences during job interviews. An interviewer or human resource person high in Machiavellianism is likely to manipulate or lie or change his or her words during an interview or job hiring process.

Workplace bullying overlap

According to Gary Namie, High Machs manipulate and exploit others to advance their perceived personal agendas and to maintain dominance over others.

The following are the guiding beliefs of those high on Machiavellianism:
 Never show humility.
 Arrogance is far more effective when dealing with others.
 Morality and ethics are for the weak.
 It is much better to be feared than loved.

High Machiavellians may be expected to do the following:
 Neglect to share important information.
 Find subtle ways of making another person look bad to management.
 Fail to meet their obligations.
 Spread false rumors about another person.

In studies there was a positive correlation between Machiavellianism and workplace bullying. Machiavellianism predicted involvement in bullying others. The groups of bullies and bully-victims had a higher Machiavellianism level compared to the groups of victims and persons non-involved in bullying. The results showed that being bullied was negatively related to the perceptions of clan and adhocracy cultures and positively related to the perceptions of hierarchy culture.

In research, Machiavellianism was positively associated with subordinate perceptions of abusive supervision (an overlapping concept with workplace bullying).

See also

References

Further reading

Books
 Alan F. Bartlett Profile of the Entrepreneur or Machiavellian Management (1987)
 Phil Harris, Andrew Lock Machiavelli, Marketing and Management (2000)

Academic papers
 JJ Teven, JC McCroskey Communication correlates of perceived Machiavellianism of supervisors: Communication orientations and outcomes Communication Quarterly Volume 54, Issue 2, (2006) Pages 127-142
 David Shackleton, Leyland Pitt, Amy Seidel Marks, (1990) Managerial Decision Styles and Machiavellianism: A Comparative Study, Journal of Managerial Psychology, Vol. 5 Iss: 1, pp. 9 – 16
 Jonason, P. K., Slomski, S., & Partyka, J. (2012). The Dark Triad at work: How toxic employees get their way. Personality and Individual Differences, 52(3), 449-453.

External links 
 Adrian Furnham Steven C. Richards Delroy L. Paulhus The Dark Triad of Personality: A 10 Year Review Social and Personality Psychology Compass 7/3 (2013): 199–216
Meet the Machiavellians -Psychology Today
Machiavellianism- -Psych Central
  New York Behavioral Health 10 July 2012 How the “Dark Triad” of Personality Traits Relates to Bullying Behaviors

Industrial and organizational psychology
Positions of authority
Machiavellianism
Workplace bullying
Mach